The Nio EP9 is a battery-powered, two-seat sports car manufactured by Chinese electric car company Nio, assisted by their Formula E racing division. The name EP9 stands for Electric Performance 9.

History 
Developed and built in 18 months, the EP9 debuted at the Saatchi Gallery in London, England.

Six EP9s have been sold to Nio investors for  each. Nio has announced that ten additional EP9s will be sold to the general public.

However, it is not a road-legal vehicle and none of the 16 production model EP9s were ever registered for road use. The EP9 is purely designed for track use and does not comply with the laws and regulations to be registered in China. None of the 16 production model EP9s were ever exported and registered for road use outside China so far.

Specifications 
Each of the EP9's wheels has its own motor and transmission. The EP9 is both all-wheel drive, and individual-wheel drive. The car has an advanced torque vectoring system that can adjust the power output to each wheel.

The EP9's battery can last up to  before it needs to be charged. Recharging takes 45 minutes, and battery replacement takes 8 minutes as the batteries need to be removed when recharged.

The car is equipped with an active suspension, including a ride height controller that makes 200 calculations per second.

The car's brakes are developed and constructed in house by NextEV.

The car's chassis construction is all carbon fibre, and is based on the FIA Le Mans Prototype regulations. The exterior is also made of the same material.

The vehicle's batteries weigh . All of the carbon fibre in the car, in total, weighs .

Performance 

The EP9 can also brake at a very short distance, as Richard Hammond demonstrated at the Eboladrome.

The car is somewhat capable of autonomous driving, which it did when the car set a record for fastest autonomous driving at the Circuit of the Americas. However, this was only possible because it was configured to drive autonomously.

Design 

The EP9's chief designer was David Hilton, who was also Nio's former senior design director.

Exterior 
The EP9's rear wing is adjustable between three settings: parked, low-drag, and high-downforce.

Interior 
The interior, like the exterior and chassis, is made entirely of carbon fibre. There are four screens: one on the driver's side of the dashboard, one on the passenger's side of the dashboard, one on the centre console, and one on the steering wheel.
 Dashboard screens - Both screens display performance data, but differ in function. The passenger-side screen displays only four measurements: the car's top speed, lap time, and lateral G-forces, and the driver's heart rate.
 Centre console screen - Displays performance data, lap times, and a track map with the car's current position.
 Steering wheel screen - The steering wheel is a simplified version of Nio's Formula E racing wheel, and is built by the same company.

World records 
The EP9 set the record for the fastest lap by an electric vehicle for the Circuit of the Americas, Shanghai International Circuit and the Circuit Paul Ricard tracks. It also set the record for the fastest lap by an autonomous vehicle at the Circuit of the Americas track. 

The EP9 used racing slicks for all of the record attempts.

See also
 List of production cars by power output
 Aspark Owl
 Rimac Concept One
 Tesla Roadster (2020)
 Volkswagen I.D. R
 Lotus Evija 
 McMurtry Spéirling

References

External links 
Official website

EP9
Electric sports cars
Cars introduced in 2017
Coupés
All-wheel-drive vehicles
Production electric cars